Foxfire is a play with songs, book by Susan Cooper, Hume Cronyn, music by Jonathan Brielle (Holtzman) and lyrics by Susan Cooper, Hume Cronyn, and Jonathan Brielle. The show was based on the Foxfire books, about Appalachian culture and traditions in north Georgia and the struggle to keep the traditions alive. 

The play was first produced at the Stratford Festival in 1980. The 1982 Broadway production starred Jessica Tandy, who won the Drama Desk Award for Outstanding Actress in a Play and the Tony Award for Best Actress in a Play for her performance. It costarred Hume Cronyn and Keith Carradine, who played a country music performer selling out the old traditions for profit. Carradine sang most of the songs in the show and most notable were the close of Act 1, "My Feet Took T' Walkin'." Other songs in the show included: "Sweet Talker," "Dear Lord," "Young Lady Take A Warning," and "Red Ear."

Hallmark movie adaptation 
It was later adapted as a TV movie in which Tandy reprised her role; she won an Emmy Award. The role originated by Carradine was played by John Denver.

References

External links

1982 plays